WEDO (810 kHz) is a commercial AM radio station licensed to McKeesport, Pennsylvania and serving Greater Pittsburgh.  It carries a brokered programming radio format.  Hosts buy segments of time on the station and may use their shows to advertise their products and services or seek donations to their ministries.  Some shows are for ethnic communities, some are religious and others are devoted to special interests.  WEDO is owned by Robert and Ashley Stevens through licensee Broadcast Communications, Inc.  The studios and offices are located at the intersection of Routes 30 and 48 in Irwin, Pennsylvania, sharing space with other BCI-owned stations.

By day, WEDO is powered at 1,000 watts.  The transmitter is off Foster Road, also in White Oak.  But AM 810 is a clear channel frequency reserved for Class A WGY Schenectady and KGO San Francisco.  So to avoid interference, WEDO must sign off at night when radio waves travel farther.  Programming is heard around the clock on 50 watt FM translator W227DB at 93.3 MHz.

History

The station signed on in 1947, at around the same time as another McKeesport-licensed radio station, WMCK AM 1360 (now WGBN).  WEDO has had only this call sign, and only three owners in its history.  Tri-City Broadcasting first put the station on the air and operated it until 1972, when it was purchased by 810, Inc., a wholly owned company headed by local entrepreneurs Ralph and Judith Baron.  Following the death of Ralph Baron, Judy Baron, now residing in Florida, has recently established a trust that would control the station in the event of her death or incapacitation.

During the 60s and 70s, WEDO became known for its Top 40 music presentation and even received more notoriety when they relocated their studios and offices inside Midtown Plaza Mall on Fifth Avenue in downtown McKeesport during the 1970s.  The mall, one of the first in suburban Pittsburgh, enabled shoppers to watch the DJ's in real time as they did their on-air shifts.

In the early 1980s, when FM emerged as the leading technology for music, WEDO gradually dropped its music for the program-oriented format that it originally had in its formative years.  As McKeesport's downtown economy continued to deteriorate, so did tenant business in Midtown Plaza Mall, as many of the stores went out of business or relocated into the suburbs.  With few tenants left in the building, the property's managers turned off heat to several areas of the mall in an effort to reduce operating costs.  A heating problem one day in 2000 resulted in a frozen pipe bursting in the mall and leaving the radio station in about two inches of standing water.  According to a former employee, it was the second time that such an incident occurred.

Management then decided to relocate to a different building.  WEDO cleared its equipment and furniture out of the mall weeks later and moved to its current location at a former bank location at 1985 Lincoln Way, where it occupies the second floor.

In the spring of 1999, WEDO was the victim of a not-so-innocent and dangerous prank committed by local high school students at its transmitter facility in Forest Hills, as explained in the April 13th and 29th, 1999 issue archives of the Tribune-Review...

Change in Ownership
On Tuesday, September 15, 2015, it was announced that 810 Inc. agreed to sell WEDO to Broadcast Communications, Inc. of Irwin, Pennsylvania, licensee of WKFB, WKHB, WANB, WKVE and three FM translators in the Pittsburgh market, plus other broadcast properties in the Cumberland, Maryland market.  The sale was finalized on January 5, 2016, at a purchase price of $175,000.

WEDO people
John James managed the station from June 1982 until retiring in 2014. James' predecessor, David Leiner took over for longtime manager John Longo in 1980.

References

External links
Official website

EDO
Radio stations established in 1947
1947 establishments in Pennsylvania
EDO
Brokered programming